The Twilight Saga: New Moon (Original Motion Picture Soundtrack)  is the official soundtrack to The Twilight Saga: New Moon. The score for The Twilight Saga: New Moon was composed by Alexandre Desplat while the rest of the soundtrack was chosen by music supervisor Alexandra Patsavas, who also produced the Twilight soundtrack. The New Moon – Original Motion Picture Soundtrack album was released on October 16, 2009 by Patsavas' Chop Shop label, in conjunction with Atlantic Records.

New Moon: Original Motion Picture Soundtrack
New Moon's soundtrack comprises songs that are all original and exclusive to the soundtrack and are performed by various indie rock and alternative rock artists. New Moon director Chris Weitz stated that the soundtrack would feature songs from Radiohead, Muse, and Band of Skulls. Death Cab for Cutie contributed the soundtrack's lead single, a song written specifically for the film called "Meet Me on the Equinox", which debuted September 13 during the MTV Video Music Awards. Bassist Nick Harmer says, "We wrote 'Meet Me On the Equinox' to reflect the celestial themes and motifs that run throughout the Twilight series and we wanted to capture that desperate feeling of endings and beginnings that so strongly affect the main characters." The music video for "Meet Me on the Equinox" premiered on October 7, 2009, and includes clips from the movie. The English rock band Muse contributed a remix of their song "I Belong to You", which appears in its original form on their 2009 album The Resistance. St. Vincent collaborated with Bon Iver's Justin Vernon to create a song called "Rosyln". When describing the song, she said, "[Justin] sings in his beautiful falsetto and I'm actually singing very, very low... I think there's something vampirey and creepy about the two of us singing together. It's a simple, stripped-down kind of song." The soundtrack originally had a release date of October 20, 2009, but the date was moved up four days to October 16 due to "overwhelming and unprecedented demand".

Track listing

Bonus DVD
 Interview — Death Cab For Cutie
 Interview — New Moon Music Supervisor (Alexandra Patsava)
 Behind-the-scenes Look at the Video Shoot for "Meet Me On The Equinox" — Death Cab For Cutie

Marketing
Hot Topic locations across the United States hosted New Moon soundtrack listening parties on the release date, October 16, where fans were able to listen to the entire soundtrack and hear special messages from the featured bands. The album's CD booklet folds out into a New Moon poster.

International versions of the soundtrack are available in certain countries, featuring bonus tracks from "local" artists. For example, Mexican Grammy and Latin Grammy nominee Ximena Sariñana is featured on Spanish language versions of the soundtrack, with the song "Frente al Mar" ("In front of the Sea").

Reception

Initial critical response to the New Moon soundtrack was generally favorable. At Metacritic, which assigns a normalized rating out of 100 to reviews from mainstream critics, the album has received an average score of 70, based on 11 reviews.

Chart performance
The soundtrack debuted at number two on the Billboard 200 albums chart, and climbed to number one a week later after selling 153,000 copies in its first full week of release. It made history as the first time ever a soundtrack and its sequel have both reached the #1 spot on the chart. The album was certified Platinum by RIAA, and has sold 1,305,000 copies in the US as of August 2013.

In New Zealand, it was certified Gold on October 18, 2009, selling over 7,500 copies in its first two days of release. The album debuted at number two and was certified Platinum after its first week of release, selling over 15,000 copies. In Australia, the soundtrack rose to number one on the iTunes Store and has largely stayed in the top five since its release. It debuted at number two on the ARIA Albums Chart in the week beginning October 26, 2009, and was certified Platinum in its first week. In Mexico, the album is jumped to No. 1 on the international album charts and No. 4 on the main chart after five weeks inside the chart, caused by the success of the film. In the UK, the album debuted at number one on the compilations chart.

Weekly charts

Year-end charts

The Twilight Saga: New Moon (The Score)

The Twilight Saga: New Moon (The Score) was composed by Alexandre Desplat and performed by the London Symphony Orchestra. He replaced Carter Burwell, who wrote the score for the previous film, Twilight (2008). Weitz has a working relationship with Desplat, who scored one of his previous films, The Golden Compass (2007).

Track listing

Reception

The score has received critical acclaim from many film music critics.

Chart performance

References

External links
Official New Moon soundtrack website

2009 soundtrack albums
2000s film soundtrack albums
Atlantic Records soundtracks
Film scores
The Twilight Saga (film series) soundtracks
Chop Shop Records soundtracks
Romance film soundtracks
Fantasy film soundtracks
Alexandre Desplat soundtracks